James Simon (29 September 1880 – 12/14 October 1944) was a German composer, pianist and musicologist.

Timeline
 Born on 29 September 1880 in Berlin
 Married on 1 May 1907 to Anna Levy in Berlin
 Birth of his son, Jörn Martin Simon on 14 September 1910 in Berlin
 Birth of his son, Ulrich Ernst Simon on 21 September 1913 in Berlin
 Emigration: 1 April 1933, via Zürich to Amsterdam, The Netherlands
 Death of his son, Jörn in 1937 in Russia during the purge of the Moscow Trials
 Deported from Westerbork 5 April 1944 to Theresienstadt, ghetto
 Transferred 12 October 1944, to Auschwitz, extermination camp
 Death: 14 October 1944, Auschwitz, extermination camp - officially declared dead, age 64

Biography
James Simon was born into a Jewish family in Berlin and murdered in Auschwitz in 1944 following his internment at Theresienstadt. He studied at the Musikhochschule in Berlin piano (Conrad Ansorge) and composition (Max Bruch). In 1934 he was forced to leave Germany to Zurich, later Amsterdam where he was arrested and deported to Theresienstadt. From there, on 12 October 1944, James Simon boarded the transport to Auschwitz and was murdered in a gas chamber shortly after his arrival. He was last seen sitting on his suitcase composing music.

His older son, Jörn Martin Simon, died in the purge of the Moscow Trials in 1937. The younger son, Ulrich Ernst Simon, survived, escaping to London, where as a young man he converted to Christianity, became a noted Anglican writer and theologian, and was a member of the council of King's College, London.

Published works
While some of Simon's piano pieces, songs and his opera Frau im Stein (1918) (based on Rolf Lauckner’s work) were published, many of his compositions remain unperformed. He is called the "Lost Composer".

His Lamento für Cello und piano (in jemenitischer Weise),  Meinem Lieber Martin! (17/18. XII. 1938) was premiered in Prague by Czech cellist František Brikcius as part of the "Weinberger Tour" on 23 April 2007 at the Spanish Synagogue.

A cantata, Ein Pilgermorgen (A Pilgrim’s Morning, 1929-30) for soprano, tenor, baritone, chorus and orchestra to a text by Rilke, survives in manuscript.

See also
 Karel Berman
 Ladislav Grünbaum Grinsky
 Pavel Haas
 Gideon Klein
 Paul Kling
 Hans Krása
 Egon Ledeč
 Rafael Schächter
 Zikmund Schul
 Viktor Ullmann

References

External links
 Biography with photo at World ORT's Music and the Holocaust
 One of James Simon's home addresses in Amsterdam
 Guide to the James Simon Collection at the Leo Baeck Institute, New York.
 Family Tree for James Simon on Geni.com
Biography and Recordings of James Simon's Compositions for Cello: https://www.mollyjonescello.com/recital-1.html

1880 births
1944 deaths
20th-century pianists
20th-century German musicians
20th-century German male musicians
20th-century German musicologists
German opera composers
German pianists
German male pianists
German male classical composers
German Jews who died in the Holocaust
German civilians killed in World War II
German people who died in Auschwitz concentration camp
Theresienstadt Ghetto prisoners
Jewish composers
Male opera composers
Musicians from Berlin
Musicologists from Berlin
People associated with King's College London